VIS Idoli was the first and only EP by the Yugoslav new wave band Idoli. The cover of the EP is the Red Nude, an act by Amedeo Modigliani.

History 
The euphoria Idoli have made with their single Maljčiki / Retko te viđam sa devojkama resulted a great expectation on the next release. The band entered the studio in April 1981. Photographs from the recording sessions were released in newspapers and magazines. The band recorded six songs, including two cover versions. The whole material was released on a 12" self-titled EP.

The band covered in an Elvis Costello style Chuck Berry's hit “Come On” but with lyrics in Serbo‐Croatian entitled "Hajde!" and "Devojko mala" for which the lyrics were taken from Nebojša Krstić's poetry book "O, Ima Načina". "Hajde!" appeared on the Dečko koji obećava movie soundtrack.

The record design and production was done by Ivan Stančić Piko and the cover was chosen to be "The Red Nude" act by Amedeo Modigliani. Guest appearances featured Film members Malden Juričić (also known as Max Wilson) who made guest appearance playing harmonica and Jurij Novoselić (also known as Kuzma Videosex) who played organ.

VIS Idoli was also released as a double cassette EP with Film's Live in Kulušić EP entitled Zajedno. A remastered version was released on the band's 2007 box set with two bonus tracks.

Promotional videos and live performances 
Promotional video was recorded for "Devojko mala" as the TV stations already broadcast the video for "Malena" and "Zašto su danas devojke ljute", which had its TV premiere on the 1981 New Year's Eve as part of Rokenroler show. The video for "Maljčiki" also premiered on the same show. For "Zašto su danas devojke ljute" was recorded a new video after the EP was released.

The EP was presented to the audience on tour with Film. Most of the shows were held at the seaside resorts. By the end of the tour Kokan Popović became the band's new drummer.

"Dok dobuje kiša (u ritmu tam-tama)" and "Malena" appeared on Vlada Divljan's 1996 live album Odbrana i zaštita.

Track listing 
All tracks by Idoli except where noted. Remastered edition included the band's second single as bonus.
 "Dok dobuje kiša (u ritmu tam-tama)" While The Rain Beats Down (In The Rhythm Of Tom-Tom) - 3:30
 "Zašto su danas devojke ljute" (Why Are The Girls Angry These Days) - 2:40
 "Devojko mala" (Hey, Little Girl) - 2:02 (D. Kraljić, B. Timotijević)
 "Ime Da Da" (Name Yes Yes) - 3:25
 "Malena" (Little One) - 6:16
 "Hajde!" (Come On!) - 1:50 (Berry, Idoli)

Bonus tracks on remastered edition 

 "Retko te viđam sa devojkama" (I Rarely See You With Girls) - 3:05 (Srđan Šaper, Vlada Divljan)
 "Maljčiki" - 3:20 (Vlada Divljan)

Personnel 
 Vlada Divljan (guitar, vocals)
 Nebojša Krstić (percussion, vocals)
 Srđan Šaper (percussion, vocals)
 Boža Jovanović (drums)
 Zdenko Kolar (bass)

External links and references 
 
 EX YU ROCK enciklopedija 1960-2006,  Janjatović Petar;  

Idoli albums
1981 debut EPs
New wave EPs
Jugoton EPs
Serbian-language albums